Tanisha Lovely Wright (born November 29, 1983) is an American basketball coach and former player. Wright is currently the head coach of the Atlanta Dream of the WNBA. She began her coaching career as an assistant coach at Charlotte. As a player, Wright played 14 WNBA seasons for the Seattle Storm, New York Liberty and Minnesota Lynx and played college basketball for the Penn State Nittany Lions. She ranks fourth in school history in points scored with 1,995 points in 134 career games for Penn State. She was drafted in the 2005 WNBA Draft by the Seattle Storm.

High school career 
Born in West Mifflin, she attended the suburban Pittsburgh West Mifflin Area High School, where she played basketball and soccer. She led the team to the W.P.I.A.L (Western Pennsylvania Interscholastic Athletic League) basketball district finals in her junior year. The team lost a close game 81–78 to  Blackhawk High School in Triple Overtime. Tanisha fouled out in the beginning of the final overtime. She led the game with 51 points. She went on to lead her team to the next seasons finals once again against Blackhawk, where she led the team in a 63–53 victory. She went on to take her team to the state finals, where they lost a close game to Allentown Central Catholic high school 56–45. The team's record was 31–1, their only loss coming in the state finals.

College career

Penn State statistics
Source

WNBA career 

Wright helped the Seattle Storm win their second championship in 2010.

On February 2, 2015, Wright signed as a free agent with the New York Liberty

In 2017, it was announced that Wright would be sitting out part of the 2017 WNBA season to rest.

On March 13, 2018, Wright signed a free agent contract with the Minnesota Lynx.

Wright was traded back to the New York Liberty on April 11, 2019, in exchange for a second-round draft pick in the 2020 WNBA draft. Following the 2019 season, Wright announced her retirement.

Coaching career  

The Las Vegas Aces announced the hiring of Wright as an assistant coach in 2020. Wright was known as a defensive specialist and helped coached the Aces into one of the league’s best defensive teams.

Head Coach  

On October 12, 2021, Wright was announced as the head coach of the Atlanta Dream.

WNBA career statistics

Regular season

|-
| align="left" | 2005
| align="left" | Seattle
| 34 || 8 || 15.5 || .462 || .000 || .667 || 1.7 || 1.6 || 0.5 || 0.1 || 1.2 || 3.6
|-
| align="left" | 2006
| align="left" | Seattle
| 33 || 0 || 15.4 || .353 || .143 || .844 || 1.8 || 1.2 || 0.3 || 0.1 || 1.6 || 3.8
|-
| align="left" | 2007
| align="left" | Seattle
| 34 || 5 || 16.1 || .400 || .273 || .846 || 1.3 || 2.0 || 0.9 || 0.1 || 1.6 || 4.1
|-
| align="left" | 2008
| align="left" | Seattle
| 34 || 14 || 23.8 || .432 || .167 || .787 || 3.4 || 2.5 || 0.9 || 0.2 || 2.3 || 7.9
|-
| align="left" | 2009
| align="left" | Seattle
| 33 || 33 || 32.5 || .463 || .267 || .906 || 3.5 || 3.9 || 1.5 || 0.3 || 2.6 || 12.2
|-
|style="text-align:left;background:#afe6ba;"| 2010†
| align="left" | Seattle
| 34 || 34 || 29.1 || .410 || .411 || .844 || 3.3 || 4.5 || 1.2 || 0.3 || 2.1 || 9.2
|-
| align="left" | 2011
| align="left" | Seattle
| 33 || 32 || 28.9 || .492 || .367 || .897 || 3.2 || 2.9 || 1.2 || 0.0 || 2.7 || 10.1
|-
| align="left" | 2012
| align="left" | Seattle
| 32 ||32 || 29.8 || .373 || .192 || .859 || 3.0 || 4.4 || 1.2 || 0.1 || 2.7 || 7.9
|-
| align="left" | 2013
| align="left" | Seattle
| 34 || 34 || 30.9 || .440 || .283 || .855 || 3.7 || 4.1 || 1.1 || 0.2 || 2.9 || 11.9
|-
| align="left" | 2014
| align="left" | Seattle
| 29 || 29 || 25.5 || .417 || .278 || .795 || 2.3 || 3.6 || 0.9 || 0.1 || 2.1 || 8.0
|-
| align="left" | 2015
| align="left" | New York
| 34 || 34 || 23.7 || .420 || .364 || .845 || 2.4 || 3.5 || 0.8 || 0.1 || 2.1 || 7.4
|-
| align="left" | 2016
| align="left" | New York
| 29 || 28 || 23.0 || .401 || .235 || .717 || 2.3 || 3.6 || 0.9 || 0.2 || 2.3 || 6.7
|-
| align="left" | 2018
| align="left" | Minnesota
| 33 || 4 || 17.8 || .383 || .396 || .741 || 1.6 || 2.0 || 0.5 || 0.1 || 1.3 || 4.3
|-
| align="left" | 2019
| align="left" | New York
| 31 || 17 || 19.8 || .415 || .368 || .806 || 2.8 || 4.1 || 1.0 || 0.3 || 1.8 || 4.7
|-
| align="left" | Career
| align="left" | 14 years, 3 teams
| 457 || 304 || 23.7 || .424 || .308 || .833 || 2.6 || 3.1 || 0.9 || 0.2 || 2.1 || 7.3

Playoffs

|-
| align="left" | 2005
| align="left" | Seattle
| 3 || 0 || 12.7 || .200 || .000 || 1.000 || 1.7 || 2.3 || 1.0 || 0.0 || 0.7 || 3.0
|-
| align="left" | 2006
| align="left" | Seattle
| 2 || 0 || 6.0 || .000 || .000 || .000 || 0.0 || 0.5 || 0.0 || 0.0 || 1.0 || 0.0
|-
| align="left" | 2007
| align="left" | Seattle
| 2 || 0 || 21.0 || .467 || .000 || 1.000 || 2.5 || 2.5 || 0.5 || 0.5 || 3.0 || 9.0
|-
| align="left" | 2008
| align="left" | Seattle
| 3 || 3 || 34.3 || .412 || .500 || .750 || 5.7 || 2.7 || 2.0 || 0.0 || 3.7 || 13.7
|-
| align="left" | 2009
| align="left" | Seattle
| 3 || 3 || 32.7 || .342 || .250 || 1.000 || 5.3 || 5.3 || 1.7 || 0.0 || 3.0 || 11.7
|-
|style="text-align:left;background:#afe6ba;"| 2010†
| align="left" | Seattle
| 7 || 7 || 28.7 || .446 || .357 || .571 || 2.6 || 2.9 || 1.3 || 0.1 || 2.7 || 9.6
|-
| align="left" | 2011
| align="left" | Seattle
| 3 || 3 || 28.0 || .588 || .600 || .833 || 4.0 || 2.3 || 1.7 || 0.3 || 3.0 || 18.7
|-
| align="left" | 2012
| align="left" | Seattle
| 3 || 3 || 37.3 || .462 || .400 || .889 || 3.7 || 6.0 || 1.0 || 0.0 || 2.3 || 11.3
|-
| align="left" | 2013
| align="left" | Seattle
| 2 || 2 || 35.0 || .583 || .333 || .000 || 2.0 || 3.0 || 2.0 || 0.0 || 3.0 || 14.5
|-
| align="left" | 2015
| align="left" | New York
| 6 || 6 || 27.3 || .516 || .500 || .714 || 2.7 || 3.8 || 1.5 || 0.0 || 1.7 || 6.5
|-
| align="left" | 2016
| align="left" | New York
| 1 || 1 || 28.0 || .714 || .333 || .000 || 1.0 || 5.0 || 0.0 || 0.0 || 4.0 || 21.0
|-
| align="left" | 2018
| align="left" | Minnesota
| 1 || 0 || 23.0 || .333 || .000 || .000 || 3.0 || 2.0 || 0.0 || 0.0 || 2.0 || 4.0
|-
| align="left" | Career
| align="left" | 12 years, 3 teams
| 36 || 28 || 27.1 || .469 || .388 || .776 || 3.0 || 3.3 || 1.3 || 0.1 || 2.4 || 9.8

Head coaching record 

|-
| align="left" | Atlanta
| align="left" | 
| 36 || 14 || 22 ||  || 5th in Eastern || — || — || — || — || Missed playoffs
|-class="sortbottom"
| align="left" |Career
| ||36||14||22|||| || — || — || — ||

Overseas career

References

External links
 Charlotte 49ers profile

1983 births
Living people
Atlanta Dream coaches
All-American college women's basketball players
American expatriate basketball people in France
American expatriate basketball people in Israel
American women's basketball players
Basketball players from New York City
Las Vegas Aces coaches
Minnesota Lynx players
New York Liberty players
Penn State Lady Lions basketball players
People from Allegheny County, Pennsylvania
Point guards
Seattle Storm draft picks
Seattle Storm players
Sportspeople from Brooklyn
Tarbes Gespe Bigorre players
Basketball coaches from New York (state)
American women's basketball coaches